The Escola Politécnica of the University of São Paulo (or the Engineering School of the University of São Paulo, Portuguese: Escola Politécnica da Universidade de São Paulo) (usually called Poli, Poli-USP or EPUSP) is an engineering school at the University of São Paulo (USP) in São Paulo, Brazil.

It was founded in 1893 - before the creation of USP itself - and was the first engineering school in the state of São Paulo. Its original name was "Escola Politécnica de São Paulo". It was incorporated by USP in 1934. Its students are known as "politécnicos".

Since many graduates from the Escola Politécnica have, throughout Brazilian history, occupied positions with public exposure and/or business and industry leadership, including ten mayors of São Paulo and six state governors, it has a reputation of "training leaders". The Escola Politécnica is part of the University of São Paulo, widely regarded as one of the best higher education institutions in Latin America, but has acquired a reputation in its own right, having its civil, electrical, mechanical, and chemical engineering courses ranked as the best in the country in 2014.

Internationally, along with the other engineering schools of USP (São Carlos School of Engineering and Lorena School of Engineering), the Escola Politécnica was ranked among the top 100 engineering schools worldwide by Academic Ranking of World Universities. Its computer science, chemical, civil, electrical/electronic, mining and mechanical engineering departments were also ranked in the top 100 worldwide in the QS World University Rankings. The school offers numerous double-degree and open exchange programs for its students, celebrating in 2015 its 1,000th double diploma between USP and its partner universities.

Admissions
Admission for undergraduates takes place annually, along with all other courses in the USP, through an exam called "vestibular" held by an institution named FUVEST (University Foundation for the Vestibular). The Escola Politécnica selects only 870 students out of 13,500 applicants, making it the largest engineering admittance exam in Brazil and also one of the most competitive. Students who have begun their engineering degree elsewhere in Brazil can also transfer to the Escola Politécnica if they pass a specific examination.

The school also admits international undergraduate students from partner universities through a separate admission process. These students can apply either for open exchanges or a double degree, in which case they receive a degree from University of São Paulo as well.

A separate process exists for master and doctoral courses.

Courses
The Escola Politécnica is regarded as having the most complete engineering program in Latin America. It offers 17 courses for undergraduate students besides 10 master and 9 doctorate tracks. It offers courses in the following fields:

Chemical Engineering
Civil Engineering
Computer Engineering
Electric Engineering - Automation and Control
Electric Engineering - Power and Automation
Electric Engineering - Electronic and Computer Systems
Electric Engineering - Telecommunications
Environmental Engineering
Materials Engineering
Mechanical Engineering
Mechatronics Engineering
Metallurgic Engineering
Mining Engineering
Naval Engineering
Nuclear Engineering
Petroleum Engineering
Production Engineering

International Partnerships 
The Escola Politécnica has established numerous exchange programs for its undergraduate students to promote their international mobility. It was the first institution outside Europe to belong to the TIME (Top Industrial Managers for Europe) network, promoting exchange programs and double degrees with several other institutions, of which Technische Universität Darmstadt, Technische Universität München, École centrale Paris, Politecnico di Milano, Politecnico di Torino. It has also a double degree program with the École Polytechnique. An average of 70 students receive a double degree from Poli and a partner institution every year, which constitutes around 10% of its student body.

Due to historical reasons and the closer links between University of São Paulo and European universities, most of the partnerships are with European institutions, especially in Germany and France. In this sense, Poli-USP has signed agreements with universities belonging to the prestigious TU9 German Institutes of Technology, Groupe des Écoles Centrales and ParisTech. However, it has also signed student exchange agreements with Asian, North and South American universities.

The following universities are partners of Poli-USP in student exchange programs:

Belgium
 Universitè Catholique de Louvain
 Université de Mons
 KU Leuven Faculty of Engineering Science

Canada
 Université du Québec à Trois – Rivières

Colombia
 Universidad de Antioquia
 Universidad Industrial de Santander
 Universidad Tecnológica de Bolívar

Finland
 Aalto University

France
 Arts et Métiers ParisTech
 CentraleSupélec - former École Centrale Paris and École Supérieure d'Électricité (Supélec)
 Chimie ParisTech
 École européenne d'ingénieurs en génie des matériaux
 École Centrale de Lille
 École Centrale de Marseille
 École Centrale de Nantes
 École Centrale de Lyon
 École nationale supérieure de chimie de Lille
 École nationale supérieure de chimie de Montpellier
 ENSTA ParisTech
 École Spéciale des Travaux Publics
 École nationale supérieure des mines de Saint-Étienne
 Grenoble INP
 École supérieure d'optique
 Mines ParisTech
 Mines Nancy
 Télécom ParisTech
 Université de Technologie de Compiègne
 Université de Toulon

Germany
 Technische Universität Darmstadt
 Technische Universität München
 Technische Universität Berlin
 Rheinisch-Westfälische Technische Hochschule Aachen
 Universität Stuttgart
 Universität Duisburg-Essen
 Universität der Bundeswehr
 Leibniz Universität Hannover
 Helmholtz Centre for Environmental Research
 Universität Bremen

India
 Indian School of Mines

Italy
 Politecnico di Milano
 Politecnico di Torino
 Università degli Studi di Padova
 Università degli Studi di Palermo
 University of Trento
 Sapienza University of Rome

Japan
 Shibaura Institute of Technology

Mexico
 Instituto Politécnico Nacional

Peru
 Pontificia Universidad Catolica del Peru

Portugal
 Instituto Superior Técnico

Singapore
 University of Singapore

South Korea
 KAIST

Spain
 Universidad de Jaen
 Universidad de Navarra
 Universidad de Zaragoza
 Universidad Politecnica de Madrid
 Universidad Politecnica de Valencia

Sweden
 Lund University

United States
 University of Utah

Venezuela
 Universidad Simón Bolívar

Budget 
The Escola Politécnica has the largest budget among Brazilian engineering schools. Its 2013 annual budget, supplied by the state of São Paulo and distributed by the university's administration was R$204.118.235,96 (~US$85.000.000).

The School receives investments from private companies as well, which currently have more than 300 agreements and contracts with the institution. One of the most well-known partnerships is with PACE, which comprises General Motors, HP, Siemens Digital Industries Software, Autodesk and Oracle. The PACE program also sponsors universities like MIT and Virginia Tech, providing high-level CAD/CAE software.

In 2011, a group of alumni created the Escola Politécnica Endowment, with the goal to gather additional resources from alumni and companies - a pioneer in Brazilian universities. In 2014, the Endowment merged with another alumni fund, called Amigos da Poli, forming a R$6.1 million fund dedicated to finance student projects.

Campus 
The Escola Politécnica is part of the Cidade Universitária, located in the city of São Paulo. The School has a constructed area of 151,500 square meters (~1,631,000 sq. ft.), being the largest among all other units in the university. It has 103 laboratories, which are part of 15 departments for teaching and research.

As of Sep/2014, the School had 4,520 undergraduate students, 841 students seeking a master's degree and 733 students seeking a PhD degree.

See also
 Patinho Feio, the first minicomputer designed and manufactured entirely in Brazil with POLI professors and students
 Victor Dubugras

References

University of São Paulo